Onland Lake is a lake in the U.S. state of Wisconsin.

Onland Lake was named after T. O. Onland (or Onneland), an early settler.

References

Lakes of Wisconsin
Bodies of water of Portage County, Wisconsin